The Green School for Girls is in an all-girls secondary school and sixth form with academy status, located in Isleworth, west London, England. It also has a new boys school situated across the road.

History
The Green School for Girls was originally a Sunday school for girls founded in 1796. It educated girls rejected from the heavily oversubscribed Blue School (now Isleworth and Syon School). The name supposedly originates from the fact that the school away gave free green clothes for the girls to wear as a uniform. In 1906 the Duke of Northumberland whose estate was Syon Park donated a new building at Busch Corner in London Road, Isleworth, which is still occupied by the school. The junior school closed in 1919. Some of the buildings suffered damage during the Blitz on three separate occasions. The school campus underwent some renovations and additions over the years but still largely occupies the original buildings.

The school's mission has always been for the children to go to school in a friendly and safe environment.

House system
The Green School for Girls splits girls into five different houses from Year 7 to Year 11; each house is named after a tree and has a distinct colour.
Beeches - Red
Chestnuts - Green
Elms - Blue
Oaks - Yellow
Willows - Orange

Notable former pupils
Gladys Mitchell, best-selling author
Sophia Myles, actress

References

External links
Official website
Ofsted report

Girls' schools in London
Secondary schools in the London Borough of Hounslow
Church of England secondary schools in the Diocese of London
Academies in the London Borough of Hounslow
Isleworth
1796 establishments in England
Educational institutions established in 1796